Minister for Science is a position in the government of Western Australia, currently held by Roger Cook as part of the McGowan Ministry. The position was first created in 2001, in the ministry of Geoff Gallop, and has existed in every government since then. The minister is responsible for the state government's Office of Science, which falls within the Department of Premier and Cabinet.

Titles
 16 February 2001 – 3 February 2006: Minister for Science
 3 February 2006 – 13 December 2006: Minister for Science and Innovation
 13 December 2006 – 23 September 2008: Minister for Science
 23 September 2008 – 21 March 2013: Minister for Science and Innovation
 21 March 2013 – present: Minister for Science

List of ministers

See also
 Minister for Education (Western Australia)
 Minister for State Development (Western Australia)

References
 David Black (2014), The Western Australian Parliamentary Handbook (Twenty-Third Edition). Perth [W.A.]: Parliament of Western Australia.

Science
Minister for Science